Sabarimala Greenfield Airport, also known as Cheruvally Estate Airport or Believers' Church Airport, is a proposed greenfield airport project to be built in Erumely of  Kottayam district in Kerala, India. The nearest railway station is Chengannur (36 km). The proposed site is 53.9 km away from Sabarimala temple and 9.2 km away from Kanjirappally town. Pathanamthitta is the closest major town from the proposed site (about 25 Kms). It is also 136 km from state capital Thiruvananthapuram and 113 km from Kochi. Once commissioned, this would be the fifth airport in the State. In February 2017, the Kerala government gave in-principle approval to construct the airport and the Kerala State Industrial Development Corporation (KSIDC) was asked to conduct a feasibility study. The Sabarimala temple, situated on the Western Ghats in Kerala's Pathanamthitta district, is one of India's holiest shrines which attracts nearly 50 million visitors per season. As of December 2019, an average of 75,000 pilgrims visit Sabarimala on a daily basis ever since the beginning of the annual pilgrim season in mid-November. Presently the only way to reach the hill shrine is by road. The increase in the number of pilgrims visiting the temple had prompted the government to look at an airport as an option to reduce traffic congestion during the pilgrimage season.

KSIDC had issued global tenders for the feasibility study of the project. The tender was won by American Consultancy firm Louis Berger Group. Louis Berger submitted a techno-economic feasibility study and environmental impact assessment of the proposed greenfield airport in December 2018. However, the consultancy did not conduct the environment impact assessment (EIA) as the state had not taken a final decision on the project including that of land acquisition. In 2019, the state government constituted a search committee to select a special officer for the project who would be given the task of coordinating with the consultancy in acquiring environment impact clearances and for the Union civil aviation ministry’s approval for the project. In December 2019, the state government appointed V. Thulasidas, managing director of the Kannur International Airport Ltd (KIAL) as the special officer for the project.

Cheruvally Estate 
The site for the proposed airport is Cheruvally Estate, formerly the site of a rubber plantation. Initially, the estate belonged to Harrison plantations and later by the RPG Goenka group. Gospel for Asia, a Christian missionary organization under Believers Eastern Church took it over from the Goenka group. The ownership of the property was disputed in 2017 before the High Court of Kerala claiming that the Estate was government land. A 2018 High Court order affirmed the church's ownership of the Estate.

See also 
 Aranmula International Airport
 List of airports in Kerala
 Believers Eastern Church

References

https://timesofindia.indiatimes.com/city/thiruvananthapuram/kial-md-spl-officer-for-sabari-airport-project/articleshow/72464046.cms

Airports in Kerala
Proposed airports in Kerala